Hugh Black may refer to:

Hugh Black (theologian) (1868–1953), Scottish-American theologian and author
Hugh David Black (1903–1942), American naval officer

See also
 Hugh the Black (died 952), Duke of Burgundy